Siddhartha Vanasthali Institute (S.V.I), in Balaju, Kathmandu, is an academic institution of Nepal. It runs from primary school level to secondary high school up to university level courses.

History and founders
Bhuwan Lal Joshi and Vijaynandan Joshi founded Vanasthali Vidyashram in 1951 jointly. This was housed in a two-storied mud building with tile roof at Balaju, six kilometers from downtown Kathmandu. The first batch of students came from the founders’ family to be followed by the children of the neighborhood. Classroom size grew gradually, though school education was considered a privilege of wealthy people.

Late Marshal General Hari Sumsher J. B. Rana donated the land. To open a school itself was a great challenging task in those days when less than 1% people were literate in Nepal and the Rana autocracy was hostile to any academic activities. In spite of harassment, the late founders were not to be daunted. Late Mr. Bhowan Lal Joshi's quest for knowledge made him go for universities in the USA where he studied varied faculties of knowledge and become a professor later. In short time his versatile personality won fame, favor and love in the world of men of letters and passed away quietly. Another founder late Hon’ble Vijayanandan Joshi, a pedant and born-teacher remained a source of inspiration to fight the multifarious problems that school had been confronted with. He died of asthma and prostate gland. The school was virtually crippled by the demise of them. Thus the school was left at the mercy of the amateurs.

Later, another sick school known as Siddhartha English Boarding School, got amalgamated with Vanasthali Vidyashram and rename it by joining the first names from each of them Siddhartha Vanasthali Secondary School.

The amalgamation brought about nothing new but a new long name. The guards of Vanasthali Vidyasharm were chased away one after another. Appointing a new headmaster revitalized struggle for survival. But in three months, he too was chased away by the students and his followers. The coming and going of the new headmasters and the teachers had been a usual phenomenon of the school. Such a trend continued till the 12th successor, Mr. Laxman Rajbanshi, took over the school management in July 1973. He was threatened by the demoralizing situation in his own empire and hostile creditors outside. He was being overburdened by the public debt of Rs. 36,000 plus three months salary of the teachers. He mortgaged his personal image, peace and happiness. There was a lack of everything – teachers, furniture, classroom, stationary, etc. Above all, there was a lack of moral courage among his colleagues. Besides financial problems, the academic standard was too frustrating to attract the talented students, which precipitate the situation.

The heightening of the teachers' moral was the most difficult task the school was most confronted with. A new scheme had been worked out in order to win over the support of the parents. Intelligent as well as poor students scholarship, financial incentives to the teachers and several other benefits were offered to revive the moribund condition of the teachers and the taught. The untiring efforts compounded with hard labor of all teaching staff, a new image of the school emerged in to light. In two years (1975) all the debt was cleared and successfully placed the students in the merit list in the nationally controlled School Graduation Examination (S.L.C.). To some extent the result regained the lost prestige. The new students began to pour in every year. Number of students raised from 78 to 5,300 from class one to ten within 12 years and the teacher's number (205) too swelled up considerably.

In order to maintain its reputation as the one of the topmost schools for the last years on the basis of its SLC result, curricular activities and physical facilities, the management gradually went on cutting down the number of the students up to the manageable size. At present there are 3000 in school and 600 students in the college and 250 teaching and 150 non-teaching staff engaged in teaching learning exercise. With the opening of tertiary level classes (XI and XII) and Three Years bachelor's degree in commerce and management (BBS) it has been renamed Siddhartha Vanasthali Institute. Classes for MA are being planned, besides teaching pure science. The academic Council has been set up aiming at promoting research work in various fields in science, art and culture at its own investment by providing researchers incentives plus laboratory equipment and chemicals for their purposes.

Notable alumni
 Sanduk Ruit
Gagan Thapa
Niruta Singh

External links
 Official website

Universities and colleges in Nepal
1973 establishments in Nepal